Carlesia sinensis is a species of flowering plant in the Apiaceae and is the only member of the genus Carlesia. It is endemic to eastern China.

Description 
The upper leaves are reduced in size and are 3-parted. The umbels (clusters of flowers)  measure  in width and their umbellules are many-flowered. The peduncles (main stalks of the inflorescence) measure . The rays normally number 7-12 but can be as numerous as 20 and measure  in length. The sepals measure  .

The species flowers and fruits from July–September.

References 

Endemic flora of China
Apioideae
Plants described in 1902